The Yellowstone Volcano Observatory (YVO) is a volcano observatory that primarily monitors the Yellowstone Caldera in Yellowstone National Park in the United States. The observatory's jurisdiction also includes volcanic centers in the states of Colorado, Utah, Arizona, and New Mexico. As with other U.S. volcano observatories, it is funded through the United States Geological Survey Volcano Hazards Program.

The observatory consists of 9 member agencies:  
The USGS, the University of Utah, the University of Wyoming, Yellowstone National Park, the Montana Bureau of Mines and Geology, the Wyoming State Geological Survey, the Idaho Geological Survey, Montana State University and UNAVCO, Inc.

YVO was founded in 2001, originally as a three-way partnership with the USGS, the University of Utah and Yellowstone National Park.  It was expanded in 2013 to include all eight current organizations.

According to the YVO website, the purpose of the observatory is: to monitor the volcanic system, to increase our scientific understanding of the Yellowstone volcanic and hydrothermal system, and to disseminate data, interpretations and accumulated knowledge to the public.

The observatory undertook a monitoring plan in 2006  that served as the basis for upgrades undertaken by the Plate Boundary Observatory, and by the USGS under the auspices of the American Recovery and Reinvestment Act of 2009.

In 2008, it published its initial response plan that sets up a series of internal protocols for data gathering and deliberation during geological events at Yellowstone.  Staff from the various observatory partner agencies form several monitoring and information teams that assess geological and geophysical data. The document also outlines how the observatory would interact with the  incident command system.

YVO provides a monthly update through its website as well as information statements for events that fall in between their normal updates.  All updates are listed on the VHP Alert Page.  Individuals can receive automated updates through the Volcano Notification Service.

In 2005, a BBC/Discovery docudrama entitled Supervolcano was released on cable television.   The drama imagines the reaction of the Yellowstone Volcano Observatory to a super eruption at the Yellowstone Caldera.  Producer Ailsa Orr credits YVO scientists as inspiration for the film's three primary characters.  The YVO Scientist-in-Charge reflected on the hype associated with volcanism at Yellowstone in a 2005 magazine article.

References

2001 establishments in Wyoming
Earth sciences
Government agencies established in 2001
United States Geological Survey
Volcano observatories
Volcanoes of the United States